

Films

References

1980 in LGBT history
1980
1980